Troisvierges is a commune and town in northern Luxembourg, in the canton of Clervaux. The two highest hills in Luxembourg, the Kneiff (560 m) and Buurgplaatz (559 m), are located in the commune.

, the town of Troisvierges, which lies in the south of the commune, has a population of 1,365.  Other towns within the commune include Basbellain, Drinklange, Hautbellain, Huldange, and Wilwerdange.

Until 28 December 1908, the commune was known as "Basbellain", after its former administrative centre. On that date, the administrative centre was moved from Basbellain to Troisvierges.

The coat of arms granted to Troisvierges in 1982 shows three virgins, representing Faith, Hope and Charity; a mountain, for the Oesling region; a stylised papal cross from the oldest known document naming the place; and a railway and wheel, for the importance of the railway in the town's development.

History
The first known reference to the place was made in 1353 under its German name Ulflingen. The French name Troisvierges was adopted in the 17th century when Walloon pilgrims started using it to refer to the three virgins Saint Fides, Saint Spes and Saint Caritas. The Franciscan church of Troisvierges was built in 1658. By 1900, most of the local population were railway and customs employees. There were some 1,550 inhabitants in 1910.

Troisvierges is known for being the site of the start of hostilities on the Western Front in the First World War. On 1 August 1914, German soldiers of the 69th Infantry Regiment disembarked at the town's railway station, violating the terms of Germany's use of the railways and hence violating Luxembourg's neutrality. This began a four-year occupation of Luxembourg by German forces.

Population

Twin towns — sister cities

Troisvierges is a member of the Charter of European Rural Communities, a town twinning association across the European Union, alongside with:

 Bienvenida, Spain
 Bièvre, Belgium
 Bucine, Italy
 Cashel, Ireland
 Cissé, France
 Desborough, England, United Kingdom
 Esch, Netherlands
 Hepstedt, Germany
 Ibănești, Romania
 Kandava, Latvia
 Kannus, Finland
 Kolindros, Greece
 Lassee, Austria
 Medzev, Slovakia
 Moravče, Slovenia
 Næstved, Denmark
 Nagycenk, Hungary
 Nadur, Malta
 Ockelbo, Sweden
 Pano Lefkara, Cyprus
 Põlva, Estonia
 Samuel, Portugal
 Slivo Pole, Bulgaria
 Starý Poddvorov, Czech Republic
 Strzyżów, Poland
 Tisno, Croatia
 Žagarė, Lithuania

Images

References

External links

 
Communes in Clervaux (canton)
Towns in Luxembourg